Oke Akpoveta (born 13 December 1991) is a Nigerian professional footballer who as a forward, most recently for Valletta.

Career
Akpoveta signed a four-year-long contract with Brøndby in the Danish Superliga on the 9 of August 2011.  He made his official debut at the 28 of August against FC Midtjylland. He got injured at the 6 of September in a reserve-match against FC Copenhagen and was out the rest of the season.
On 6 January 2014, Akpoveta had his contract with Brøndby cancelled by mutual consent.

In January 2014 Akpoveta moved to Ravan Baku in the Azerbaijan Premier League, signing an 18-month contract. In April 2014, Akpoveta was given permission to return to Denmark for a couple of days, but then failed to return to the club, and left the club permanently at the end of the season.

On 16 July 2014 Akpoveta returned to Denmark signing an 18-month contract with Danish First Division side Brønshøj. On 30 June 2015, Akpoveta signed a 12-month contract with Danish First Division side Lyngby.

In the January transfer window Akpoveta was loaned out to Swedish Superettan club IK Frej for the remainder of the 2015–16 season. He impressed, scoring 12 goals in 13 games. As a result, on 13 July 2016, fellow Superettan club Dalkurd revealed that the club had signed Akpoveta on a free transfer after a few weeks speculation. After a trial with the Superettan rival club Helsingborgs IF where he made an assist in a friendly against Odense, Akpoveta signed for Helsingborgs IF on 17 February 2017 for an unknown fee.

On 16 February 2019, Akpoveta signed a six-month contract with Azerbaijan Premier League club Sabail FK.

On 31 July 2019, Akpoveta returned to IK Frej, where he signed a one-and-a-half-year contract. Six months later, in January 2020, Akpoveta signed a two-year contract with Norrby IF. Akpoveta then had short stints with Saudi club Al-Thoqbah, Finnish club KPV, and Swedish club Höganäs before joining Maltese club Valletta on 25 July 2022. His contract with Valletta was terminated by mutual consent on 29 December 2022, making him a free agent.

Career statistics

References

External links
  (archive)
 
 Oke Akpoveta at Fotbolltransfers.com 

1991 births
Living people
AFC Eskilstuna players
Al-Thoqbah Club players
Association football forwards
Azerbaijan Premier League players
Brøndby IF players
Dalkurd FF players
Danish Superliga players
Division 2 (Swedish football) players
Expatriate footballers in Azerbaijan
Expatriate footballers in Finland
Expatriate footballers in Malta
Expatriate footballers in Saudi Arabia
Expatriate footballers in Sweden
Expatriate men's footballers in Denmark
Helsingborgs IF players
IK Frej players
Kokkolan Palloveikot players
Maltese Premier League players
Nigerian expatriate footballers
Nigerian expatriate sportspeople in Azerbaijan
Nigerian expatriate sportspeople in Denmark
Nigerian expatriate sportspeople in Finland
Nigerian expatriate sportspeople in Malta
Nigerian expatriate sportspeople in Saudi Arabia
Nigerian expatriate sportspeople in Sweden
Nigerian footballers
Norrby IF players
Ravan Baku FC players
Sabail FK players
Saudi First Division League players
Sportspeople from Warri
Superettan players
Valletta F.C. players
Ykkönen players